Ragged Peak is a mountain, in the Tuolumne Meadows area of Yosemite National Park. 

Of the ridge south of the Young Lakes region, Ragged Peak is the most prominent feature.

Ragged Peak is an isolated summit, close to Young Lakes.

Ragged Peak is north of Lembert Dome and Dog Lake.

On climbing Ragged Peak

So, Ragged Peak is available, for rock climbing.

References

External links and references

 On hiking up Ragged Peak, mentions the first climb, by white hikers
 Hiking Ragged Peak, via the Dog Lake trail
 An account by hikers, who climbed Ragged Peak
 More hikers, who climbed Ragged Peak, with many photos
 A YouTube video, from Ragged Peak's summit
 Some area photos

Mountains of Yosemite National Park
Mountains of Tuolumne County, California